Zwanger & Co is a 2022 Dutch film directed by Johan Nijenhuis. The film won the Golden Film award after having sold 100,000 tickets.

Lieke van Lexmond and Waldemar Torenstra play roles in the film. Imanuelle Grives and Manuel Broekman also play roles in the film.

References

External links 
 

2022 films
2020s Dutch-language films
Films directed by Johan Nijenhuis
Films shot in the Netherlands